The Toronto Purchase was the sale of lands in the Toronto area from the Mississaugas of New Credit to the British crown. An initial, disputed, agreement was made in 1787, in exchange for various items. The agreement was revisited in 1805, intended to clarify the area purchased. The agreement remained in dispute for over 200 years until 2010, when a settlement for the land was made between the Government of Canada and the Mississaugas for the land and other lands in the area.

1787 purchase

Under the Treaty of Paris which ended the conflict between Great Britain and its former colonies, the boundary of British North America was set in the middle of the Great Lakes. This made the land north of the border more important, strategically and as the place for Loyalists to settle after the war. In 1781, the Mississaugas surrendered a strip of land along the Niagara River, and in 1783, land on the Bay of Quinte for the Mohawks who had been loyal to the British to settle (today's Tyendinaga Mohawk Territory). Between 1783 and 1785, 10,000 Loyalists arrived and were settling on land the Crown had recognized as Indian Land. In 1784, the Mississaugas surrendered more land in the Niagara peninsula, including land on the Grand River for the Iroquois.

In 1786, Lord Dorchester arrived in Quebec City as Governor-in-Chief of British North America. His mission was to solve the problems of the newly landed Loyalists. At first, Dorchester suggested opening the new Canada West as districts under the Quebec government, but the British Government made known its intention to split Canada into Upper and Lower Canada. Dorchester began organizing for the new province of Upper Canada, including a capital. Under the policy of the time, the British recognized aboriginal title to the land and Dorchester arranged to purchase the lands from the Mississaugas.

The 1787 purchase, according to British records, was conducted on September 23, 1787, at the "Carrying-Place" of Bay of Quinte. The British crown and the Mississaugas of New Credit met to arrange for the sale of lands along Lake Ontario. In the case of the Toronto area, the Mississaugas of New Credit exchanged  of land in what became York County (most of current Toronto and the Regional Municipality of York bounded by Lake Ontario to the south, approximately Etobicoke Creek and Highways 427 and 50 (both part of a now mostly-vanished road known as Indian Line, which was named due to it forming the purchase boundary) to the west, approximately Ashbridge's Bay/Woodbine Avenue-Highway 404 to the east and approximately south of Sideroad 15-Bloomington Road to the north) for some money, 2,000 gun flints, 24 brass kettles, 120 mirrors, 24 laced hats, a bale of flowered flannel, and 96 gallons of rum.

At the time, the Mississaugas believed that the agreement was not a purchase extinguishing their rights to the land, but a rental of the lands for British use in exchange for gifts and presents in perpetuity. 

In 1788, surveyor Alexander Aitken was assigned to conduct a survey of the Toronto site. The Mississaugas blocked him from surveying west of the Humber, saying the lands to the west had not been ceded. Aitken was only allowed to survey the land after British authorities interceded with the Mississaugas. Aitken surveyed west to Etobicoke Creek, but did not survey more than a few miles from the lake (as far north as the northern limit of where the creek forms the present Toronto-Mississauga limits) before stopping to avoid further confrontation.

1805 indenture
An Indenture (a revision) of the deal was made on August 1, 1805. Both the 1787 Purchase and its 1805 Indenture were registered as Crown Treaty No. 13. For this revision, the Mississaugas of New Credit First Nation also claimed the Toronto Islands, which was not part of the purchase as the agreement only went to the Lake Ontario shoreline.

The land sold consists of:

 former City of Etobicoke
 former City of North York
 former (pre-amalgamation) City of Toronto
 former City of York
 former Borough of East York
 City of Vaughan
 King Township
 southwestern part of Markham
 western part of Whitchurch

The Purchased was signed by Sir John Johnson, William Claus (deputy superintendent of Indian Affairs representing the Crown). Witness consisted of:

British
 Captain JW Williams of the 49th Regiment
 Prideaux Selby of the Indian Department

Confirming Indian Chief Totems
  Jean-Bonaventure Rousseaux '(Jean Rousseaux)' - fur trader

First Nations

Chehalk
Queneperion
Okemaperesse
Wabensse
Kenebonecence
Osenego
Acheton

2010 settlement
Starting in 1986, the Mississaugas opened a land claims settlement process with the Government of Canada to rectify its grievance over the Toronto Purchase and a smaller plot of land near Burlington Bay. In 2010, Canada agreed to pay  for the lands, based on the ancient value of the land, extrapolated to current dollars. The money was distributed to the band government, with each of the 1,700 present-day Mississaugas receiving $20,000, with the rest placed in trust for future generations.

See also
 Crawford Purchase
 Lord Dorchester
 Head of Lake Purchase 1806 - additional lands to the west of Toronto in what is the southern part of Mississauga, Ontario, Oakville and Burlington excluding small tracts covered in Treaty 22 (Mississauga and Oakville) and Brant Tract Treaty No. 18 1797 (Burlington)
 Ajetance Treaty No. 19 - additional lands north of Head of Lake Purchase for the remainder of Mississauga, Brampton, Ontario, Caledon, Ontario, Halton, Milton, Erin, East Garafraxa as well as parts of Guelph, Centre Wellington and Orangeville
 Rouge Tract Claim or Gunshot Treaty - covering most of Markham (excluding parts in Toronto Purchase but not covering lands east of Little Rouge Creek), eastern parts of Richmond Hill, Stouffville, and a small section of northeastern North York and Scarborough

References

Citations

Bibliography

External links

 Toronto Purchase
 Land Claims of the Mississaugas of the New Credit First Nation

History of Toronto
1787 in Canada
1787 treaties
Mississaugas